"Cheating" is a song by English singer John Newman. The song was released on 6 October 2013 as the second single from his debut studio album, Tribute (2013). The song was written by John Newman and Emily Phillips. The song peaked at number 9 on the UK Singles Chart.

This song has been modified with different lyrics on the 2014 Toyota Yaris commercial in Indonesia.

Music video
A music video to accompany the release of "Cheating" was first released onto YouTube on 22 August 2013 at a total length of three minutes and forty-one seconds. The video shows Newman invoking guilt in a cheating lover by performing the song on a nearby rooftop. The video also starts with a shot of a newspaper, referencing to Newman's earlier music video, "Love Me Again", which had ended with the two main characters encountering a car crash. The newspaper's headline read, "Couple survives Hit-and-Run".

Critical reception
Lewis Corner of Digital Spy gave the song a positive review stating:

Despite already having two chart-toppers to his name, John Newman recently told us that he "constantly wants more". It's a necessary determination to have in today's cut-throat music industry and is made slightly easier when there's plenty of talent to back it up with. The last we heard from the Yorkshire crooner he was asking his beau for forgiveness over perky brass and rattling breakbeats, but the tables have seemingly turned on his latest offering. "But if you're cheating, cheat on, yeah/ 'Cause cheating's just the thing you do," Newman coolly notes over spry horns and Italo piano lines, before the sass levels are elevated by a soulful gospel choir by the song's end. It's a classy retaliation to his Shakespearean-styled cuckolding that reinforces his dominance of UK neo soul. And as for wanting that third number one? With this little anthem in his repertoire, we can't see that being too much of a problem.

Track listing

Credits and personnel
 Lead vocals – John Newman
 Lyrics – John Newman and Emily Phillips
 Producers – Ant Whiting, John Newman and Mike Spencer
 Label – Island

Chart performance

Weekly charts

Year-end charts

Release history

References

2013 singles
2013 songs
John Newman (singer) songs
Island Records singles
Songs about infidelity
Torch songs
Song recordings produced by Ant Whiting
Songs written by John Newman (singer)